Oleszna Podgórska  is a village in the administrative district of Gmina Lubomierz, within Lwówek Śląski County, Lower Silesian Voivodeship, in south-western Poland. Prior to 1945 it was called Kruemmols, belonging to the state of Schlesien within Germany.

References

Villages in Lwówek Śląski County